Josef Albert Amann (1 July 1866, in Munich – 17 October 1919, in Konstanz) was a German gynecologist. His father, Josef Albert Amann (1832–1906), was also a gynecologist.

He studied medicine at the University of Munich, where his teachers included Karl Wilhelm von Kupffer, Otto Bollinger and Franz von Winckel. For several years he worked as an assistant at the university women's clinic in Munich, receiving his habilitation in 1892. In 1898 he succeeded his father as head of the second gynecological department at the Allgemeine Krankenhaus in Munich. In 1905 he became an associate professor at the university.

He held a particular interest in the anatomy and histology of female genitalia. In 1897 he published Kurzgefasstes Lehrbuch der mikroskopisch-gynäkologischen Diagnostik, an influential  textbook of microscopic gynecological diagnostics. Also, he is credited with introducing a surgery for creation of an artificial vagina in cases of congenital absence ("Amann's operation").

References 

1866 births
1919 deaths
Ludwig Maximilian University of Munich alumni
Academic staff of the Ludwig Maximilian University of Munich
German gynaecologists